The True Story of Mary: Who Wanted To Stand On Her Head is a 2005 Children's chapter book by Jane Godwin. It is a rhyming story about a girl called Mary who, upon standing on her head, has a number of adventures.

Godwin described it as "probably the strangest story I have written".

Reception
The True Story of Mary has been reviewed by Australian Bookseller & Publisher, The Bulletin with Newsweek, and Reading Time.

It is a 2006 Aurealis Awards Childrens short story joint winner, and a 2006 Children's Book Council of Australia shortlisted book of the year for younger readers.

See also
Dr. Seuss bibliography
Edward Lear
The Walrus and the Carpenter

References

External links

Library holdings of The True Story of Mary

2005 children's books
Australian picture books
Nonsense poetry